Sylvester or Silvester is a given name and a surname.

Sylvester may also refer to:

Film
Sylvester (film), a 1985 film starring Richard Farnsworth
New Year's Eve (1924 film) or Sylvester, a 1924 German film by Lupu Pick

People
Pope Sylvester I (died 335), Saint Sylvester
Pope Sylvester II (c. 946–1003)
Pope Sylvester III (died 1062 or 1063)
Sylvester of Marsico (c. 1100-1162), Count of Marsico in the Kingdom of Sicily
Sylvester of Kiev (c. 1055–1123), clergyman and writer in Kievan Rus
Antipope Sylvester IV, a claimant from 1105 to 1111
Sylvester of Assisi (died 1240), companion of Saint Francis of Assisi
Sylvester of Worcester, early 13th-century Bishop of Worcester
Sylvester of Antioch, 18th-century Greek bishop
Sylvester (singer)

Places
Lake Sylvester System, Australia
Sylvester, Nova Scotia, Canada
Mount Sylvester, Canada
Sylvester, Georgia, U.S.
Sylvester, Texas, U.S.
Sylvester, West Virginia, U.S.
Sylvester, Wisconsin, U.S.
St. Silvester, Fribourg, Switzerland

Other uses
Sylvester (crater), a crater on the moon
Sylvester the Cat, a Looney Tunes character
Euploea sylvester, a butterfly species
Sylvester, a donkey in the children's book Sylvester and the Magic Pebble
 Sylvester, a device for safely removing pit props in mines, invented by Walter Sylvester

See also
Felis silvestris or wildcat
Saint Sylvester (disambiguation)
Saint-Sylvestre (disambiguation)
Silvester
Silvestre
Silvesterklaus
Sylvestre (disambiguation)
Sylwester